Methanobacteriales is an order of archaeans in the class Methanobacteria.  Species within this order differ from other methanogens in that they can use fewer catabolic substrates and have distinct morphological characteristics, lipid compositions, and RNA sequences. Their cell walls are composed of pseudomurein. Most species are Gram-positive with rod-shaped bodies and some can form long filaments. Most of them use formate to reduce carbon dioxide, but those of the genus Methanosphaera use hydrogen to reduce methanol to methane.

Phylogeny
The currently accepted taxonomy is based on the List of Prokaryotic names with Standing in Nomenclature (LPSN)  and National Center for Biotechnology Information (NCBI).

See also
 List of Archaea genera

References

Further reading

Scientific journals

Scientific books

External links

Archaea taxonomic orders
Euryarchaeota